

Pa 

 Lucien Turcotte Pacaud b. 1879 first elected in 1911 as Liberal member for Mégantic, Quebec.
 Massimo Pacetti b. 1962 first elected in 2002 as Liberal member for Saint-Léonard—Saint-Michel, Quebec.
 Rey Pagtakhan b. 1935 first elected in 1988 as Liberal member for Winnipeg North, Manitoba.
 Daniel Paillé b. 1950 first elected in 2009 as Bloc Québécois member for Hochelaga, Quebec.
 Pascal-Pierre Paillé b. 1978 first elected in 2008 as Bloc Québécois member for Louis-Hébert, Quebec.
 Henry Nicholas Paint b. 1830 first elected in 1882 as Conservative member for Richmond, Nova Scotia.
 John Cameron Pallett b. 1921 first elected in 1954 as Progressive Conservative member for Peel, Ontario.
 Brian Pallister b. 1954 first elected in 2000 as Canadian Alliance member for Portage—Lisgar, Manitoba.
 Acalus Lockwood Palmer b. 1820 first elected in 1872 as Liberal member for City and County of St. John, New Brunswick.
 Jim Pankiw b. 1966 first elected in 1997 as Reform member for Saskatoon—Humboldt, Saskatchewan.
 Annick Papillon b. 1980 first elected in 2011 as New Democratic Party member for Québec, Quebec. 
 Louis-Joseph Papineau b. 1861 first elected in 1908 as Liberal member for Beauharnois, Quebec.
 Steve Paproski b. 1928 first elected in 1968 as Progressive Conservative member for Edmonton Centre, Alberta.
 Anselme Homère Pâquet b. 1830 first elected in 1867 as Liberal member for Berthier, Quebec.
 Eugène Paquet b. 1867 first elected in 1904 as Conservative member for L'Islet, Quebec.
 Pierre Paquette b. 1955 first elected in 2000 as Bloc Québécois member for Joliette, Quebec.
 Christian Paradis b. 1974 first elected in 2006 as Conservative member for Mégantic—L'Érable, Quebec.
 Denis Paradis b. 1949 first elected in 1995 as Liberal member for Brome—Missisquoi, Quebec.
 François-Xavier Paradis first elected in 1890 as Conservative member for Napierville, Quebec.
 Frederick Forsyth Pardee b. 1866 first elected in 1905 as Liberal member for Lambton West, Ontario.
 Philippe Paré b. 1935 first elected in 1993 as Bloc Québécois member for Louis-Hébert, Quebec.
 Charles Eugène Parent b. 1894 first elected in 1935 as Liberal member for Quebec West and South, Quebec.
 Georges Parent b. 1879 first elected in 1904 as Liberal member for Montmorency, Quebec.
 Gilbert Parent b. 1935 first elected in 1974 as Liberal member for St. Catharines, Ontario.
 Louis-Étienne Parent b. 1875 first elected in 1930 as Liberal member for Terrebonne, Quebec.
 Joseph Aimé Roger Parizeau b. 1920 first elected in 1958 as Progressive Conservative member for Lac-Saint-Jean, Quebec.
 Rob Parker b. 1943 first elected in 1978 as Progressive Conservative member for Eglinton, Ontario.
 Sid Parker b. 1930 first elected in 1980 as New Democratic Party member for Kootenay East—Revelstoke, British Columbia.
 Thomas Sutherland Parker b. 1829 first elected in 1867 as Liberal member for Wellington Centre, Ontario.
 Charles Henry Parmelee b. 1855 first elected in 1896 as Liberal member for Shefford, Quebec.
 Carolyn Parrish b. 1946 first elected in 1993 as Liberal member for Mississauga West, Ontario.
 John Edmund Parry b. 1946 first elected in 1984 as New Democratic Party member for Kenora—Rainy River, Ontario.
 James Ernest Pascoe b. 1900 first elected in 1958 as Progressive Conservative member for Moose Jaw—Lake Centre, Saskatchewan.
 Esioff-Léon Patenaude b. 1875 first elected in 1915 as Conservative member for Hochelaga, Quebec.
 William Paterson b. 1839 first elected in 1872 as Liberal member for Brant South, Ontario.
 Bernard Patry b. 1943 first elected in 1993 as Liberal member for Pierrefonds—Dollard, Quebec.
 Claude Patry b. 1953 first elected in 2011 as New Democratic Party member for Jonquière—Alma, Quebec.
 Alexander Bell Patterson b. 1911 first elected in 1953 as Social Credit member for Fraser Valley, British Columbia.
 James Colebrooke Patterson b. 1839 first elected in 1878 as Conservative member for Essex, Ontario.
 James Edward Jack Patterson b. 1884 first elected in 1935 as Liberal member for Victoria—Carleton, New Brunswick.
 William Albert Patterson b. 1841 first elected in 1891 as Conservative member for Colchester, Nova Scotia.
 Jeremy Patzer first elected in 2019 as Conservative member for Cypress Hills—Grasslands, Saskatchewan. 
 Rémi Paul b. 1921 first elected in 1958 as Progressive Conservative member for Berthier—Maskinongé—delanaudière, Quebec.
 William James Paul b. 1854 first elected in 1911 as Conservative member for Lennox and Addington, Ontario.
 Pierre Paul-Hus b. 1969 first elected in 2015 as Conservative member for Charlesbourg—Haute-Saint-Charles, Quebec.
 Monique Pauzé b. 1959 first elected in 2015 as Bloc Québécois member for Repentigny, Quebec.
 Jean Payne b. 1939 first elected in 1993 as Liberal member for St. John's West, Newfoundland and Labrador.
 LaVar Payne b. 1945 first elected in 2008 as Conservative member for Medicine Hat, Alberta. 
 William Hector Payne b. 1914 first elected in 1958 as Progressive Conservative member for Coast-Capilano, British Columbia.

Pe 

 George Pearkes b. 1888 first elected in 1945 as Progressive Conservative member for Nanaimo, British Columbia.
 Albert John Pearsall b. 1915 first elected in 1974 as Liberal member for Coast Chilcotin, British Columbia.
 Frederick M. Pearson b. 1827 first elected in 1870 as Liberal member for Colchester, Nova Scotia.
 Glen Pearson b. 1950 first elected in 2006 as Liberal member for London North Centre, Ontario. 
 Lester Bowles Pearson b. 1897 first elected in 1948 as Liberal member for Algoma East, Ontario.
 Cyrus Wesley Peck b. 1871 first elected in 1917 as Unionist member for Skeena, British Columbia.
 Edward Armour Peck b. 1858 first elected in 1925 as Conservative member for Peterborough West, Ontario.
 Ève Péclet b. 1988 first elected in 2011 as New Democratic Party member for La Pointe-de-l'Île, Quebec.
 Ambrose Hubert Peddle b. 1927 first elected in 1968 as Progressive Conservative member for Grand Falls—White Bay—Labrador, Newfoundland and Labrador.
 Isaac Ellis Pedlow b. 1861 first elected in 1917 as Laurier Liberal member for Renfrew South, Ontario.
 Charles Alphonse Pantaléon Pelletier b. 1837 first elected in 1869 as Liberal member for Kamouraska, Quebec.
 François Jean Pelletier b. 1863 first elected in 1917 as Laurier Liberal member for Matane, Quebec.
 Gérard Pelletier b. 1919 first elected in 1965 as Liberal member for Hochelaga, Quebec.
 Irénée Pelletier b. 1939 first elected in 1972 as Liberal member for Sherbrooke, Quebec.
 Louis Conrad Pelletier b. 1852 first elected in 1891 as Conservative member for Laprairie, Quebec.
 Louis-Philippe Pelletier b. 1857 first elected in 1911 as Conservative member for Quebec County, Quebec.
 René-Antoine Pelletier b. 1908   first elected in 1935 as Social Credit member for Peace River, Alberta.
 Gaston Péloquin b. 1939 first elected in 1993 as Bloc Québécois member for Brome—Missisquoi, Quebec.
 Peter Penashue b. 1964 first elected in 2011 as Conservative member for Labrador, Newfoundland and Labrador.
 Lawrence T. Pennell b. 1915 first elected in 1962 as Liberal member for Brant—Haldimand, Ontario.
 B. Keith Penner b. 1933 first elected in 1968 as Liberal member for Thunder Bay, Ontario.
 Robert Pennock b. 1936 first elected in 1984 as Progressive Conservative member for Etobicoke North, Ontario.
 Edward Goff Penny first elected in 1896 as Liberal member for St. Lawrence, Quebec.
 Charlie Penson b. 1942 first elected in 1993 as Reform member for Peace River, Alberta.
 Jean-Luc Pépin b. 1924 first elected in 1963 as Liberal member for Drummond—Arthabaska, Quebec.
 Lucie Pépin b. 1936 first elected in 1984 as Liberal member for Outremont, Quebec.
 Janko Peric b. 1949   first elected in 1993 as Liberal member for Cambridge, Ontario.
 Pat Perkins b. 1953 first elected in 2014 as Conservative member for Whitby—Oshawa, Ontario. 
 Rick Perkins first elected in 2021 as Conservative member for South Shore—St. Margarets, Nova Scotia. 
 Ernest Perley b. 1877 first elected in 1930 as Liberal member for Qu'Appelle, Saskatchewan.
 George Halsey Perley b. 1857 first elected in 1904 as Conservative member for Argenteuil, Quebec.
 William Dell Perley b. 1838 first elected in 1887 as Conservative member for Assiniboia East, Northwest Territories.
 William Goodhue Perley b. 1820 first elected in 1887 as Conservative member for City of Ottawa, Ontario.
 Fizalam-William Perras b. 1876 first elected in 1925 as Liberal member for Wright, Quebec.
 Joseph Stanislas Perrault b. 1846 first elected in 1879 as Conservative member for Charlevoix, Quebec.
 Manon Perreault b. 1965 first elected in 2011 as New Democratic Party member for Montcalm. 
 Ray Perrault b. 1926 first elected in 1968 as Liberal member for Burnaby—Seymour, British Columbia.
 Gérard Perron b. 1920 first elected in 1962 as Social Credit member for Beauce, Quebec.
 Gilles-A. Perron b. 1940 first elected in 1997 as Bloc Québécois member for Saint-Eustache—Sainte-Thérèse, Quebec.
 Robert Perron b. 1915 first elected in 1953 as Progressive Conservative member for Dorchester, Quebec.
 Yves Perron first elected in 2019 as Bloc Québécois member for Berthier—Maskinongé, Quebec.
 Charles Perry first elected in 1867 as Conservative member for Peterborough West, Ontario.
 Stanislaus Francis Perry b. 1823 first elected in 1874 as Liberal member for Prince County, Prince Edward Island.
 Joe Peschisolido b. 1963 first elected in 2000 as Canadian Alliance member for Richmond, British Columbia.
 Douglas Dennison Peters b. 1930 first elected in 1993 as Liberal member for Scarborough East, Ontario.
 Arnold Peters b. 1922 first elected in 1957 as Cooperative Commonwealth Federation member for Timiskaming, Ontario.
 James Scott Peterson b. 1941 first elected in 1980 as Liberal member for Willowdale, Ontario.
 Kyle Peterson b. 1971 first elected in 2015 as Liberal member for Newmarket—Aurora, Ontario.
 Peter James Peterson b. 1953 first elected in 1984 as Progressive Conservative member for Hamilton West, Ontario.
 Daniel Petit b. 1947 first elected in 2006 as Conservative member for Charlesbourg—Haute-Saint-Charles, Quebec.
 Ginette Petitpas Taylor first elected in 2015 as Liberal member for Moncton—Riverview—Dieppe, New Brunswick.
 Nathaniel Pettes b. 1816 first elected in 1874 as Liberal member for Brome, Quebec.
 William Varney Pettet b. 1858 first elected in 1896 as Patrons of Industry member for Prince Edward, Ontario.
 Pierre Pettigrew b. 1951 first elected in 1996 as Liberal member for Papineau—Saint-Michel, Quebec.
 George Hamilton Pettit b. 1872 first elected in 1925 as Conservative member for Welland, Ontario.

Ph 

 Frank Philbrook b. 1931 first elected in 1974 as Liberal member for Halton, Ontario.
 Arthur Phillips b. 1930   first elected in 1979 as Liberal member for Vancouver Centre, British Columbia.
 Orville Howard Phillips b. 1924   first elected in 1957 as Progressive Conservative member for Prince, Prince Edward Island.
 Elmore Philpott b. 1896   first elected in 1953 as Liberal member for Vancouver South, British Columbia.
 Jane Philpott b. 1960 first elected in 2015 as Liberal member for Markham—Stouffville, Ontario. 
 Beth Phinney b. 1938   first elected in 1988 as Liberal member for Hamilton Mountain, Ontario.

Pi 

 Louis-Philippe Picard b. 1899   first elected in 1940 as Liberal member for Bellechasse, Quebec.
 Michel Picard b. 1960 first elected in 2015 as Liberal member for Montarville, Quebec.
 Pauline Picard b. 1947   first elected in 1993 as Bloc Québécois member for Drummond, Quebec.
 Camille Piché b. 1865 first elected in 1904 as Liberal member for St. Mary, Quebec.
 Jerry Pickard b. 1940   first elected in 1988 as Liberal member for Essex—Kent, Ontario.
 John Pickard b. 1824 first elected in 1868 as Independent Liberal member for York, New Brunswick.
 Follin Horace Pickel b. 1866 first elected in 1930 as Conservative member for Brome—Missisquoi, Quebec.
 Jack Pickersgill b. 1905   first elected in 1953 as Liberal member for Bonavista—Twillingate, Newfoundland and Labrador.
 Samuel Walter Willet Pickup b. 1859 first elected in 1904 as Liberal member for Annapolis, Nova Scotia.
 Allan Ernest Pietz b. 1925   first elected in 1984 as Progressive Conservative member for Welland, Ontario.
 Louis-Joseph Pigeon b. 1922   first elected in 1958 as Progressive Conservative member for Joliette—l'Assomption—Montcalm, Quebec.
 Jean Pigott b. 1924   first elected in 1976 as Progressive Conservative member for Ottawa—Carleton, Ontario.
 Gary Pillitteri b. 1936   first elected in 1993 as Liberal member for Niagara Falls, Ontario.
 François Pilon b. 1958 first elected in 2011 as New Democratic Party member for Laval—Les Îles, Quebec.
 J.-E. Bernard Pilon b. 1918   first elected in 1962 as Liberal member for Chambly—Rouville, Quebec.
 Joseph Albert Pinard b. 1878   first elected in 1936 as Liberal member for Ottawa East, Ontario.
 Roch Pinard b. 1910   first elected in 1945 as Liberal member for Chambly—Rouville, Quebec.
 Yvon Pinard b. 1940   first elected in 1974 as Liberal member for Drummond, Quebec.
 Alfred Pinsonneault b. 1830 first elected in 1867 as Conservative member for Laprairie, Quebec.
 Walter Pitman b. 1929   first elected in 1960 as New Party member for Peterborough, Ontario.

Pl 

 Louis Plamondon b. 1943   first elected in 1984 as Progressive Conservative member for Richelieu, Quebec.
 John Milton Platt b. 1840 first elected in 1882 as Liberal member for Prince Edward, Ontario.
 Samuel Platt b. 1812 first elected in 1875 as Independent member for Toronto East, Ontario.
 Hugh John Plaxton b. 1904   first elected in 1935 as Liberal member for Trinity, Ontario.
 André Plourde b. 1937   first elected in 1984 as Progressive Conservative member for Kamouraska—Rivière-du-Loup, Quebec.
 Lucien Plourde b. 1930   first elected in 1962 as Social Credit member for Quebec West, Quebec.
 Josiah Plumb b. 1816 first elected in 1874 as Conservative member for Niagara, Ontario.
 D'Arcy Britton Plunkett b. 1872 first elected in 1928 as Conservative member for Victoria, British Columbia.

Po 

 Pierre Poilievre b. 1979 first elected in 2004 as Conservative member for Nepean—Carleton, Ontario.
 Joseph Alphée Poirier b. 1899   first elected in 1940 as Liberal member for Bonaventure, Quebec.
 Denise Poirier-Rivard b. 1941   first elected in 2004 as Bloc Québécois member for Châteauguay—Saint-Constant, Quebec.
 Jean-Claude Poissant b. 1960 first elected in 2015 as Liberal member for La Prairie, Quebec. 
 Roger Pomerleau b. 1947   first elected in 1993 as Bloc Québécois member for Anjou—Rivière-des-Prairies, Quebec.
 William Albert Pommer b. 1895   first elected in 1953 as Liberal member for Lisgar, Manitoba.
 Eric Joseph Poole first elected in 1935 as Social Credit member for Red Deer, Alberta.
 James Colledge Pope b. 1826 first elected in 1873 as Conservative member for Prince County, Prince Edward Island.
 John Henry Pope b. 1824 first elected in 1867 as Liberal-Conservative member for Compton, Quebec.
 Rufus Henry Pope b. 1857 first elected in 1889 as Conservative member for Compton, Quebec.
 Arthur Portelance b. 1928   first elected in 1968 as Liberal member for Gamelin, Quebec.
 Victor Clarence Porteous b. 1893   first elected in 1930 as Conservative member for Grey North, Ontario.
 Edward Guss Porter b. 1859 first elected in 1902 as Conservative member for Hastings West, Ontario.
 Robert Porter b. 1833 first elected in 1887 as Liberal-Conservative member for Huron West, Ontario.
 Robert Harold Porter b. 1933   first elected in 1984 as Progressive Conservative member for Medicine Hat, Alberta.
 Vincent-Joseph Pottier b. 1897   first elected in 1935 as Liberal member for Shelburne—Yarmouth—Clare, Nova Scotia.
 Fabian Hugh Poulin b. 1931   first elected in 1972 as Liberal member for Ottawa Centre, Ontario.
 Raoul Poulin b. 1900   first elected in 1949 as Independent member for Beauce, Quebec.
 Barthélemy Pouliot b. 1811 first elected in 1867 as Conservative member for L'Islet, Quebec.
 Charles Eugène Pouliot b. 1856 first elected in 1896 as Liberal member for Témiscouata, Quebec.
 Jean-Baptiste Pouliot b. 1816 first elected in 1874 as Liberal member for Témiscouata, Quebec.
 Jean-François Pouliot b. 1890   first elected in 1924 as Liberal member for Témiscouata, Quebec.
 John Poupore b. 1817 first elected in 1878 as Conservative member for Pontiac, Quebec.
 William Joseph Poupore b. 1846 first elected in 1896 as Conservative member for Pontiac, Quebec.
 Henry Absalom Powell b. 1855 first elected in 1895 as Liberal-Conservative member for Westmorland, New Brunswick.
 Charles Gavan Power b. 1888 first elected in 1917 as Laurier Liberal member for Quebec South, Quebec.
 Charles J. Power b. 1948 first elected in 1997 as Progressive Conservative member for St. John's West, Newfoundland and Labrador.
 Francis Gavan Power b. 1918 first elected in 1955 as Liberal member for Quebec South, Quebec.
 James Augustine Power b. 1903 first elected in 1953 as Liberal member for St. John's West, Newfoundland and Labrador.
 Patrick Power b. 1815 first elected in 1867 as Anti-Confederate member for Halifax, Nova Scotia.
 William Power b. 1849 first elected in 1902 as Liberal member for Quebec West, Quebec.
 Russ Powers b. 1949 first elected in 2004 as Liberal member for Ancaster—Dundas—Flamborough—Westdale, Ontario.
 Marcus Powlowski b. 1960 first elected in 2019 as Liberal member for Thunder Bay—Rainy River, Ontario. 
 Christian Henry Pozer b. 1835 first elected in 1867 as Liberal member for Beauce, Quebec.

Pr 

 David Pratt b. 1955   first elected in 1997 as Liberal member for Nepean—Carleton, Ontario.
 Robert John Pratt b. 1907 first elected in 1957 as Progressive Conservative member for Jacques-Cartier—Lasalle, Quebec.
 Joseph Raymond Fournier Préfontaine b. 1850 first elected in 1886 as Liberal member for Chambly, Quebec.
 Jim Prentice b. 1956   first elected in 2004 as Conservative member for Calgary North Centre, Alberta.
 Joe Preston b. 1955   first elected in 2004 as Conservative member for Elgin—Middlesex—London, Ontario.
 Richard Franklin Preston b. 1860 first elected in 1922 as Conservative member for Lanark, Ontario.
 Jules-Édouard Prévost b. 1871 first elected in 1917 as Laurier Liberal member for Terrebonne, Quebec.
 Wilfrid Prévost b. 1832 first elected in 1872 as Liberal member for Two Mountains, Quebec.
 David Price b. 1945   first elected in 1997 as Progressive Conservative member for Compton—Stanstead, Quebec.
 Joseph Price b. 1945   first elected in 1984 as Progressive Conservative member for Burin—St. George's, Newfoundland and Labrador.
 Otto Baird Price b. 1877   first elected in 1925 as Conservative member for Westmorland, New Brunswick.
 William Price b. 1867 first elected in 1908 as Conservative member for Quebec West, Quebec.
 William Evan Price b. 1827 first elected in 1872 as Liberal member for Chicoutimi—Saguenay, Quebec.
 Penny Priddy b. 1944 first elected in 2006 as New Democratic Party member for Surrey North, British Columbia. 
 William Pridham b. 1841 first elected in 1892 as Conservative member for Perth South, Ontario.
 M. Ervin Pringle b. 1910 first elected in 1968 as Liberal member for Fraser Valley East, British Columbia.
 Robert Abercrombie Pringle b. 1855 first elected in 1900 as Conservative member for Cornwall and Stormont, Ontario.
 Edward Gawler Prior b. 1853 first elected in 1888 as Conservative member for Victoria, British Columbia.
 John Pritchard b. 1861 first elected in 1921 as Progressive member for Wellington North, Ontario.
 Robert William Prittie b. 1919 first elected in 1962 as New Democratic Party member for Burnaby—Richmond, British Columbia.
 John Oliver Probe b. 1900 first elected in 1945 as Cooperative Commonwealth Federation member for Regina City, Saskatchewan.
 Dick Proctor b. 1941 first elected in 1997 as New Democratic Party member for Palliser, Saskatchewan.
 Denis Pronovost b. 1953 first elected in 1988 as Progressive Conservative member for Saint-Maurice, Quebec.
 George Proud b. 1939 first elected in 1988 as Liberal member for Hillsborough, Prince Edward Island.
 John Hugh Proudfoot b. 1912 first elected in 1949 as Liberal member for Pontiac—Témiscamingue, Quebec.
 Edmond Proulx b. 1875 first elected in 1904 as Liberal member for Prescott, Ontario.
 Isidore Proulx b. 1840 first elected in 1891 as Liberal member for Prescott, Ontario.
 Marcel Proulx b. 1946 first elected in 1999 as Liberal member for Hull—Aylmer, Quebec.
 Carmen Provenzano b. 1942 first elected in 1997 as Liberal member for Sault Ste. Marie, Ontario.
 Lemuel Ezra Prowse b. 1858 first elected in 1908 as Liberal member for Queen's, Prince Edward Island.
 Marcel Prud'homme b. 1934 first elected in 1964 as Liberal member for Saint-Denis, Quebec.
 George Prudham b. 1904 first elected in 1949 as Liberal member for Edmonton West, Alberta.
 Matthew William Pruyn b. 1819 first elected in 1885 as Conservative member for Lennox, Ontario.

Pu 

 David Vaughan Pugh b. 1907 first elected in 1958 as Progressive Conservative member for Okanagan Boundary, British Columbia.
 William Pugsley b. 1850 first elected in 1907 as Liberal member for City and County of St. John, New Brunswick.
 Patrick Purcell b. 1833 first elected in 1887 as Liberal member for Glengarry, Ontario.
 Gordon Purdy b. 1888 first elected in 1935 as Liberal member for Colchester—Hants, Nova Scotia.
 Alfred Putnam b. 1836 first elected in 1887 as Conservative member for Hants, Nova Scotia.
 Harold Putnam b. 1868 first elected in 1921 as Liberal member for Colchester, Nova Scotia.
 Arthur Puttee b. 1868 first elected in 1900 as Labour Party member for Winnipeg, Manitoba.

P